John Walsh  (1856 – 26 August 1925) was a prominent Irish businessman, and a nationalist politician of the All-for-Ireland League.  He was Member of Parliament (MP) for  County Cork South from 1910 until 1918, taking his seat in the House of Commons of what was then the United Kingdom of Great Britain and Ireland.

Born in Bandon, County Cork, he was an extensive farmer and chairman of the Beamish and Crawford Bottling Co. Ltd. Cork.,  as well as head of J. P. Walsh & Co..  Was a member of the Cork County Council  (1910–1920) in his capacity as chairman of the Bandon Rural District Council.  J.P.,  co. Cork.

In the December 1910 general elections he was returned as MP for the constituency of South Cork, representing William O'Brien's All-for-Ireland League. Together with the other party members he did not contest his seat in the 1918 election.

He died at Kilbrittain on 26 August 1925 and was buried privately.

Notes

External links 
 
 

1856 births
1925 deaths
UK MPs 1910–1918
All-for-Ireland League MPs
Members of the Parliament of the United Kingdom for County Cork constituencies (1801–1922)
Local councillors in County Cork
Politicians from County Cork